The Jewish Labour Movement (JLM), known as Poale Zion (Great Britain) from 1903 to 2004, is one of the oldest socialist societies affiliated to the UK Labour Party.

It is a member of the progressive coalition of Avodah/Meretz/Arzenu/Ameinu within the World Zionist Organization. Its sister parties are the Israeli Labor Party (Havodah) and Meretz.

JLM is affiliated to the Board of Deputies of British Jews and the Zionist Federation of Great Britain and Ireland.

Its objects are to maintain and promote Labour or Socialist Zionism as the movement for self-determination of the Jewish people within the state of Israel, and to support, develop and promote political activists who work to enable the objects and values of the Jewish Labour Movement.

Aims and membership
The organisation's aim is stated as "To organise and maintain a political movement of Jewish people within the UK Labour Party and the international labour movement".

Full membership is open to Jewish people, while non-Jewish supporters can apply for ally membership. Only full members are eligible for a vote in JLM processes and internal elections. Members of parties which oppose the Labour Party in elections are ineligible for membership.

The values of the JLM are centred around a connection between socialism, the Labour Party and socialist Zionism, and the values which are espoused by these movements, including international peace and cooperation, social justice, equality and freedom. This doctrine is enshrined in the organisation's constitution and values, which state their values as including 'international peace and cooperation,' 'democratic socialism in the UK and Israel, 'the application of 'Jewish ethical principles to create a society based on social justices and a sustainable environment', 'to promote the centrality of Israel in Jewish life' and opposition to 'fascist, racist and anti-Semitic groups.'

Poale Zion

Establishment
The origins of Poale Zion in Britain were in the Ma'aravi ("Western") Society, formed in London in 1902 by Jewish socialist journalist Kalman Marmor, under the influence of the Eastern European Labour Zionist movement led by Marxist theorist Ber Borochov. Branches of Poale Zion were formed in London and Leeds in 1903/04 and 1905 respectively, and in Manchester and Liverpool by 1906. Two branches were formed in London, one by the garment workers union, one by the Independent Cabinet Makers Union. A permanent headquarters was opened in Whitechapel in February 1904, and a nationwide organisation was launched at a conference in Manchester in 1906.

Early 20th century
Poale Zion was active in Britain during World War I, under the leadership of J Pomeranz and Morris Meyer, and influential on the British labour movement, including on the drafting (by Sidney Webb and Arthur Henderson) of the Labour Party’s War Aims Memorandum, recognising the "right of return" of Jews to Palestine, a document which preceded the Balfour Declaration by three months. In this period, it published the periodical Jewish Labour Correspondence.

After World War I, Poale Zion published several pamphlets in Yiddish and a Yiddish journal, Undzer Veg. Shlomo Kaplansky collaborated with the Independent Labour Party in setting up the Vienna International of socialist parties.

In mid-1920, the World Union of Poale Zion in Vienna set up a Poale Zion office in London, led by Shlomo Kaplansky and David Ben-Gurion. The office was in rooms in Petticoat Lane, where Moshe Sharett worked part-time translating Yiddish into English. They built contacts with both Labour and the Independent Labour Party, and succeeded in becoming affiliated to the British Labour Party in 1920 under the name of The Jewish Socialist Labour Party, claiming membership of 3,000, although actual membership was a few hundred. One issue that they tried to influence policy on was the northern border of Palestine which was being decided at the San Remo conference. They hoped that it would be extended as far as the Litani River. They had only limited success in influencing Labour Party Middle East policy and the office closed in March 1921. However, party leader Ramsay MacDonald was influenced by PZ, who would publish his pamphlet A Socialist in Palestine (1922) documenting his visit to Palestine.

In 1923, Leah L'Estrange Malone became the organisation's first female chair.

By 1928, the World Union of Poale Zion claimed to have 1,000 members in the United Kingdom. World PZ leader Dov Hoz was based in the UK in 1928, and set about reviving and re-organising Poale Zion (Great Britain), including inspiring PZ members to become more active in the mainstream Labour Party. Young Poale Zion was launched in Bethnal Green in 1928, by Sam Dreen.

Poale Zion and Dov Hoz played a crucial role in the 1930 Whitechapel and St Georges by-election, swinging the Jewish vote behind the non-Jewish Labour candidate, James Henry Hall, rather than the Jewish Liberal candidate Barnett Janner.

In the 1940s, Poale Zion (Great Britain) claimed a membership of nearly 2,000.

Late 20th century
In 1957, Poale Zion played a role in the formation of Labour Friends of Israel, with which it continues to work.

In June 1982,  Poale Zion formed a Scottish branch, with the MP for East Kilbride, Maurice Miller, becoming its chair. In the mid-1980s, PZ claimed a paper membership of 2,000.

Before the Arab-Israeli war of 1967, Poale Zion represented the dominant pro-Zionist view within the British Labour Party. However, as the left became increasingly anti-Zionist, relations with the left of the party were increasingly tense. For instance, in April 1983 women members of Poale Zion were prevented from attending an International Women's Day seminar at the Greater London Council's County Hall, and in 1984 it was proposed that the Labour Party end the connection.

In 1985, Eric Heffer suggested Poale Zion as a model for a black socialist society, as a way for Labour Party Black Sections to represent black and minority members within the party structure. In the 1990s, PZ affiliated to the Anti-Racist Alliance, a black-led anti-racist movement closely aligned to the Labour Party Black Sections and founded by Marc Wadsworth, and later to its successor the National Assembly Against Racism.

Leading postwar members of Poale Zion included Maurice Orbach; Samuel Fisher, Baron Fisher of Camden; Leo Abse, who set up the Cardiff branch in 1948; Mary Mikardo and Ian Mikardo; Simon Pinner and his son Hayim Pinner, who was president of the youth wing and editor in the 1960s of its paper Jewish Vanguard; the brothers Leslie and Harold Lever (Leslie served as chair); Percy Sassoon Gourgey, secretary in 1959 and chair 1964–67; Sidney Goldberg, general secretary at the time of the 1967 Arab-Israeli war; and Eric Moonman, chair in the 1970s. Reginald Freeson served as the political secretary of Poale Zion, co-chair and editor of its journal Vanguard in the late 1980s to early 1990s. In the 1990s, Lawrie Nerva was chair. In 2002, Louise Ellman was vice-chair.

Jewish Labour Movement

2004–2015
Poale Zion (Great Britain) was relaunched as the Jewish Labour Movement (JLM) in 2004 in response to changes within global left Zionism during the Second Intifada, with an increased focus on Britain's Jewish community. Louise Ellman recounts that the July 2004 'launch at the House of Commons was a highly successful event, with the Israeli Ambassador and the Foreign Office Minister responsible for Middle East matters as guest speakers. Messages of goodwill were delivered from the Prime Minister, the Board of Deputies of British Jews and the World Labour Zionist Movement'. Louise Ellman rose from being vice-chair to chair in 2006, a position she held until 2016.

There were JLM speakers at the official commemorations of the Battle of Cable Street on its 75th and 80th anniversaries in 2011 and 2016 respectively.

In the 2015 Labour Party leadership election, JLM nominated Yvette Cooper.

The 2016 restructure
After ten years in the role, Louise Ellman retired as Chair to become Honorary President. Her successor, Jeremy Newmark, was a former CEO of the UK's Jewish Leadership Council and a former spokesperson for the previous Chief Rabbi, Jonathan Sacks. He had also stood as a Labour candidate for Parliament in 2017, in Finchley and Golders Green. Sarah Sackman and Mike Katz were elected as Vice-Chairs. Sackman had stood as Labour's candidate in the Finchley and Golders Green constituency in the 2015 general election while Katz was selected as a Labour Party candidate in the 2016 London Assembly election.  Peter Mason, the former director of London Jewish Forum and a councillor in Ealing, became national secretary. He was also elected to Labour's National Constitutional Committee, which handles disciplinary cases, the first JLM candidate to be elected to a national committee for 20 years. It followed a report by former Liberty director Shami Chakrabarti that recommended a transfer of powers to the NCC. 
 
The Jewish Chronicle, observing that '(JLM's) affiliation to Labour as a socialist society means it benefits from inside access to the party's various structures and systems', said that 'Mr Newmark is adamant that, to win the battle, Jews have to remain in the party rather than decamp in the face of Jew-hatred.' Newmark said "There are some people who have left the party. I respect their position and understand it up to a point but I don't agree with it on any level. If you leave a political vacuum, others will come in and fill it. The whole purpose of JLM is to become an organising focus within the party and a space for people who feel Labour is their political home." In March 2016, David Hirsh of Engage, in an article entitled "Jew hate and today's Left", noted that "The Jewish Labour Movement—the old Poale Zion—is emerging as a key organising focus within the Labour Party." The JLM was described by The Jewish Chronicle as a 'gathering-place for moderates concerned about the direction the party is taking under Mr Corbyn' and affiliate membership was established for non-Jews. Membership increased to around 1,000 with a "flood" of affiliate members showing their "support and solidarity". The 2016 JLM annual general meeting voted unanimously to adopt a new structure to enable it to increase its engagement inside the Labour Party on a local, regional and national basis. In the 2016 Labour Party leadership election, when MPs unsuccessfully sought to replace Jeremy Corbyn, JLM nominated Owen Smith after over 90% of its members voted for him in an internal ballot. Some commentators concluded that the revived JLM wished to remove or weaken Corbyn and others sympathetic to the Palestinians.

Young people who had had some success in their early political careers were appointed to a range of roles in the organisation. They included networks officer, Rachel Wenstone, former National Union of Students vice-president; political education officer, Jay Stoll, a senior parliamentary assistant to a Labour MP and former general secretary of the London School of Economics' student union; campaigns officer, Adam Langleben, who had been elected to Barnet Council; and youth and student officer, Liron Velleman, still a student but holding a role in the party's Chipping Barnet branch. In July 2016, Ella Rose was appointed as the organisation's first director. Rose was formerly a Union of Jewish Students president and a Public Affairs Officer at the Israeli Embassy. She also sat on the Advisory Board of the Jewish Leadership Council's Lead programme and on the Board of Deputies of British Jews.

In September 2017, the JLM held its first ever one day conference.

By February 2018, the JLM had over 2,000 members, according to National Secretary Peter Mason.

Leadership and organisation
In February 2018, Jeremy Newmark resigned as chair of the JLM after The Jewish Chronicle published an internal audit report into his conduct while he was CEO of the Jewish Leadership Council. It was alleged that, between 2006 and 2013, he defrauded the council of more than £10,000. The newspaper claimed that the council had covered up his alleged behaviour and accepted his resignation on the grounds of ill health. Newmark denied any wrongdoing, though he resigned as Chair of the JLM two days later to enable him to respond to the allegations. Later in February, the JLM reported some financial matters to the police for investigation. He was replaced by Ivor Caplin.

In October 2018, the Director, Ella Rose, left for a role with the Holocaust Educational Trust.

In April 2019, Mike Katz was elected National Movement Chair, defeating Ivor Caplin, and Ruth Smeeth was elected as Parliamentary Chair, succeeding Luciana Berger, who resigned from the Labour Party in February 2019. Joe Goldberg, Sarah Sackman and Stephane Savary were elected as National Vice-Chairs. In January 2020, Margaret Hodge became Parliamentary Chair while Ruth Smeeth, who was no longer an MP, became a National Vice-Chair.

In October 2019, the Honorary President, Louise Ellman, resigned from the Labour Party but said that she was not planning to support another party, meaning she remained eligible to be a member.

The Jewish Labour Movement has a Local Government Network which seeks to recruit ambassadors in every Labour Group across the country to be a point of contact, educate local members and work with JLM nationally. Its Jewish Councillors Network provides a space for and support to Jewish Labour councillors nationally as representatives and campaigners for the Party and political leaders and role models within the Jewish community. The Youth and Students section provides 14–26 year old members a network and opportunities to engage with the JLM and the Labour Party.

Relationship with the party
At the September 2017 Labour Party Conference, new rules proposed by the Jewish Labour Movement were adopted making hate speech a disciplinary offence.

In March 2018, the JLM supported a demonstration by Jewish groups against the Labour Party leadership's handling of antisemitism.

In April 2018, the Jewish Labour Movement asked for and received a guarantee that JLM would remain Labour's only Jewish affiliate, after suggestions that Jewish Voice for Labour might be allowed to affiliate. This was one of 19 requests made by JLM to the Labour Party, alongside six set by Jewish community organisations.

In September 2018, as the JLM asked, Labour added all 11 IHRA Working Definition of Antisemitism examples, unamended, to the Party's code of conduct.

In October 2018, the JLM appealed to Labour Party members to send it examples of antisemitism within Labour.

In November 2018, the JLM submitted a dossier of examples to the Equality and Human Rights Commission and asked it to investigate the Labour Party which, it said, was "institutionally anti-Semitic".

In March 2019, Jeremy Corbyn wrote to the JLM conveying his and the shadow cabinet's "very strong desire for you to remain a part of our movement" following reports that it was considering disaffiliating. In April 2019, former Prime Minister Gordon Brown and the Mayor of London, Sadiq Khan, announced that they had joined the JLM. Brown said that he joined to support Jews in light of antisemitism in the Labour Party. Khan said he had joined "to demonstrate 'support and appreciation'" for British Jews. In April 2019, JLM decided to remain affiliated to the Labour Party but passed a motion of no confidence in Jeremy Corbyn over his alleged mishandling of anti-Semitism within the party.

In July 2019, JLM described Labour's appointment of a liaison officer to improve the party's relationships with the Jewish community as a "pointless, ineffective gesture".

In September 2019, the JLM held a rally at the Middle Street Synagogue in Brighton during the Labour Party Conference. Speakers included MPs, Ruth Smeeth, Margaret Hodge, Alex Sobel, Louise Ellman, Stella Creasy and Rosie Duffield, Seb Dance MEP, the Mayor of London, Sadiq Khan, Luke Akehurst, director of We Believe in Israel and secretary of Labour First, Nathan Yeowell, director of Progress, Miriam Mirwitch, chair of Young Labour and Rania Ramli, chairperson of the recently disbanded Labour Students. Smeeth said that "This isn't a fight for Jews (or) equality in the party – this is a fight for the Labour Party." Hodge drew loud cheers when she promised that "I'm not going to give up until Jeremy Corbyn ceases to be leader of the Labour Party."

In December 2019, the JLM made a submission to the Equality and Human Rights Commission as part of the EHRC's investigation into anti-Semitism in the Labour Party. It offered alleged incidents of anti-Semitism in the Labour Party, including the description of Jewish Labour MP Margaret Hodge as a 'Zionist remedial cancer' and a 'Zionist bitch,' as well as the discriminatory practices of the South Tottenham CLP towards prospective ultra-orthodox Jewish members. It also alleged the labelling of Jews as 'child killers,' 'subhuman' and 'Zio scum,' and told of how Jews were told that 'Hitler was right.'

In 2020, the JLM nominated Lisa Nandy in the 2020 Labour Party leadership election and Ian Murray in the 2020 Labour Party deputy leadership election, in both cases by a small margin.

Training
Following its 2016 restructuring, JLM offered training on antisemitism awareness to Constituency Labour Parties.

In 2018, the JLM refused to provide antisemitism awareness training to those subject to disciplinary proceedings as they did not believe training was an appropriate sanction.

In August 2018, the JLM refused to offer training at the Party's annual conference, after disagreeing with the Party leadership over its content.

In March 2019, the JLM suspended their training programme. JLM said that their role had been undermined after the Labour Party announced it planned to enrol staff and members of the National Executive Committee and National Constitutional Committee on a short course on antisemitism being developed by the Pears Institute for the Study of Antisemitism, despite Labour's stated intention of consulting Jewish communal organisations prior to its implementation. In July 2019, JLM suspended a member who had continued to provide training on antisemitism.

In July 2019, the JLM refused to collaborate with the Labour Party in developing educational materials on antisemitism.

In June 2020, the JLM said they would not undertake antisemitism training for all Labour staff, as Keir Starmer had requested, while "staff who were central to the failure to deal with antisemitism under Mr Corbyn remained in their jobs".

In mid–July 2021, Labour's National Executive Committee announced that all prospective Labour candidates would be trained by the Jewish Labour Movement to deal with anti-Semitism. The Jewish Labour Movement also welcomed the NEC's decision to ban four alleged far left factions, namely Resist, Labour Against the Witchhunt, the Labour in Exile Network and Socialist Appeal, during that same meeting.

Campaigning
In April 2019, Katz said that JLM would be selective in campaigning for Labour candidates in future elections, saying "If you're backing the leadership and the way they have handled antisemitism – then you are absolutely not going to get our support" and "If you clearly and consistently support us...then we will have your back".

JLM said their members would not campaign for Lisa Forbes in the June 2019 Peterborough by-election after it was revealed she had liked a social media post of a video of children praying in solidarity with the victims of the Christchurch mosque shootings with accompanying text which commented that Theresa May had a "Zionist slave masters agenda", and had expressed her "enjoyment" in reading a thread which included a comment that Islamic State had been founded and funded by the CIA and Mossad. Forbes said that she had liked the video and the content of a long thread of posts and had not noticed the specific comments.

In October 2019, The Jewish Chronicle reported that the JLM's members would not campaign in support of Labour candidate Ross Houston in Finchley and Golders Green in the December 2019 general election as a show of solidarity with its previous Parliamentary Chair, Luciana Berger, who was standing for the Liberal Democrats in the seat. It was later reported that day that the JLM had announced that "We will not be campaigning unless in exceptional circumstances and for exceptional candidates, like our parliamentary chair Ruth Smeeth, and members of the parliamentary Labour party who've been unwavering in their support of us. We will not be giving endorsements to candidates in non-Labour-held seats". According to The Independent, JLM "is expected to draw attention (during the campaign) to Labour MPs who it believes have a poor record of tackling antisemitism".

Responses
The JLM has attracted some criticism from within the Labour Party. Critics contended that the JLM had become largely dormant by the early 21st century and was only revived following the election of Jeremy Corbyn. In September 2017, Michael Kalmanovitz, of the International Jewish Anti-Zionist Network, at a fringe meeting hosted by the "Free Speech on Israel" group alongside the Labour Party conference, asked "What are JLM and LFI doing in our Party? It's time we campaigned to kick them out". At the same conference, a number of Jewish members of the Labour Party launched Jewish Voice for Labour as "an alternative voice for Jewish members of Labour" who do not support the Jewish Labour Movement's "profoundly Zionist orientation", contending that "the JLM cannot represent all Jewish members of the Labour Party when it is committed 'to promote the centrality of Israel in Jewish life' as well as the wider Jerusalem Programme of the World Zionist Organization."

In March 2018, the Morning Star criticised the JLM for its "unquestioning zionism" and for being "unscrupulous enough to call fellow Jews anti-semites when the real fallout is between zionists and anti-zionists." In April 2018, after the JLM voted that it had no confidence in Corbyn, the political secretary of the Labour Representation Committee commented "[JLM] is campaigning to make a Labour government impossible! They are stabbing us in the back. That is insupportable. The JLM must be disaffiliated from Labour as soon as possible."

See also
 Habonim Dror
 Independent Jewish Voices
 Israel lobby in the United Kingdom
 The Lobby (TV series)
 Jewdas
 Jewish Socialists' Group
 Jewish Voice for Labour

References

Footnotes

Bibliography 
Alderman, Geoffrey. London Jewry and London Politics, 1889–1986, Cambridge University Press, 1989. 
 Edmunds, June. The Left’s Views on Israel: From the establishment of the Jewish state to the intifada,  PhD thesis, London School of Economics and Political Science, 2014.
 Gorny, Yosef. The British Labour Movement and Zionism: 1917–1948 London: Frank Cass, 1983.
 Mendes, P. Jews and the Left: The Rise and Fall of a Political Alliance, Springer, 20 May 2014.
 Rubinstein, W. D.; Jolles, Michael A.; Rubinstein, Hilary L. The Palgrave Dictionary of Anglo-Jewish History. Palgrave Macmillan, 2011.

Further reading 
 Bar, Hilik. "UK and Israeli Labour: strengthening ties Progress, 11 April 2014
 Dysch, Marcus. "The loyalists standing their ground against Labour's tide of hate", The Jewish Chronicle, 7 April 2016
 Levenberg, S. Poale Zion: 100 Years of the Jewish Labour Movement in Britain. London: Poale Zion, 1972
 Sargent, Andrew. The British Labour Party and Palestine 1917–1949. PhD thesis, University of Nottingham, 1980 
 Shimoni, G. "Poale Zion: a Zionist Transplant in Britain (1905–1945)" Studies in Contemporary Jewry, 2, 1986

External links 
 
 List of publications at WorldCat
 English Poale Zion Conference Interprets Macdonald Letter As Reaffirmation of Balfour Declaration, Jewish Telegraphic Agency, London. 11 April 1931

1903 establishments in the United Kingdom
Jewish organisations based in the United Kingdom
Labour Party (UK) socialist societies
Organizations established in 1903
Poale Zion
Zionism in the United Kingdom
Zionist organizations